The 1960–61 Egyptian Premier League, was the 11th season of the Egyptian Premier League, the top Egyptian professional league for association football clubs, since its establishment in 1948. The season started on 7 October 1960 and concluded on 16 April 1961.
Al Ahly managed to win the league for the tenth time in the club's history.

League table 

 (C)= Champions, (R)= Relegated, Pld = Matches played; W = Matches won; D = Matches drawn; L = Matches lost; F = Goals for; A = Goals against; ± = Goal difference; Pts = Points.

Top goalscorers

Teams

References

External links 
 All Egyptian Competitions Info

5
1960–61 in African association football leagues
1960–61 in Egyptian football